Kyle Lake (June 12, 1972 – October 30, 2005) was an American Baptist pastor and author. He was pastor of University Baptist Church in Waco, Texas until his death in 2005. He was considered part of the Emerging church movement.

Biography
Jeffery Kyle Lake was born on June 12, 1972 in Tyler, Texas to David and Shirley Lake. He attended Andy Woods Elementary and graduated from Robert E. Lee High School in 1990 where he was co-captain of the state runner-up Lee Soccer Team.  On May 30, 1998, he married Jennifer Gornto of Clear Lake, Texas. Lake earned a Bachelor's degree in Speech Communications and Religion from Baylor University in 1994 before receiving a Master of Divinity degree from George W. Truett Theological Seminary in 1997.

Ministry
Kyle Lake was pastor of University Baptist Church, founded in 1995 by Chris Seay and Christian recording artist David Crowder. Crowder is also a main worship leader in the collegiate Passion movement.

Lake closed his sermons with the phrase "Love God, Embrace Beauty, and Live Life to the Fullest," a benediction that is still recited by the church at the end of every service.

Lake was known for his ability to reach out to younger audiences such as the college-age crowd. Many students said they were drawn to his ability to preach the gospel in a way young people could understand and easily relate to their own lives.

Personal life 
He was married, and the father of three children – a daughter named Avery, and twin boys, Jude and Sutton Lake.

Death
Lake was electrocuted on October 30, 2005 as he stepped into baptismal waters and reached out to adjust a microphone. The event corresponded with homecoming activities at nearby Baylor University and more than 800 people were present when the tragedy occurred. Several doctors in the congregation rushed to Lake when he collapsed, but efforts to revive him were unsuccessful and he was pronounced dead at Hillcrest Baptist Medical Center around 11:30 a.m. The woman Lake was set to baptize was also rushed to the hospital, but she was not seriously injured and it is believed that she had not yet stepped into the water when the electrocution happened.

"At first, there was definitely confusion just because everyone was trying to figure out what was going on," Ben Dudley, former community pastor at University Baptist, told the Waco Tribune-Herald. "Everyone just immediately started praying."

At a remembrance attended by about 1,000 people that night at First Baptist Church Waco, Dudley told the UBC congregation that they would move forward as a church. "I don't know how, when, why, where or what's going to happen, but we will continue as a church in the community because that is what Kyle would have wanted."

Movie
In the spring of 2006, several Baylor University students and friends of Kyle created a short film based on his last sermon titled "Kyle's Film". David Crowder Band and Robbie Seay Band provided the music for the film, which features a montage of artistic images narrated to Lake's last sermon.

Book
In 2011, a book about his life, "That's Kyle", is published by his father, David Lake.

See also
Emerging Church

References

Published works
(RE)Understanding Prayer: A Fresh Approach to Conversation With God, 2005 (Relevant Books) 
Understanding God's Will: How To Hack The Equation Without Formulas, 2004 (Relevant Books)

External links
 The Kyle Lake Foundation
 UBC Waco
 "Kyle's Film"
 Footprints project: The Legacy of Kyle Lake

1972 births
2005 deaths
20th-century American clergy
20th-century Baptists
21st-century American clergy
21st-century American male writers
21st-century American non-fiction writers
21st-century Baptists
Accidental deaths by electrocution
Accidental deaths in Texas
American Christian writers
Baptists from Texas
Baylor University alumni
Emerging church movement
People from Tyler, Texas
People from Waco, Texas
Writers from Texas
20th-century American male writers